Alan Bennett is an English playwright known for his work film, theatre and television.

He has received various awards for his work in film, television and theatre. For film he earned an Academy Award for Best Adapted Screenplay nomination for The Madness of King George (1994). He also received four British Academy Film Award nominations for A Private Function (1984), Prick Up Your Ears (1987), and The Madness of King George (1994), winning Outstanding British Film for the latter. For his work on television he has received eight British Academy Television Awards for Talking Heads (1989), Screen Two (1992), and Talking Heads 2 winning for the latter.

For his work in theatre he has received four competitive Laurence Olivier Awards for his work on the West End. He won for Single Spies in 1990, Talking Heads in 1992, and The History Boys in 2005. That same year he received the Society of London Theatre Special Award. He has also received two Tony Awards for his work on the Broadway stage. He won a Special Tony Award in 1963 for Beyond The Fringe alongside Peter Cook and Dudley Moore. He also won Best Play for The History Boys in 2005. He also won a Drama Desk Award, five Evening Standard Theatre Awards, three New York Drama Critics Circle Awards, two London Film Critics Circle Awards, and an Outer Critics Circle Award.

Major associations

Academy Awards

BAFTA Awards

Laurence Olivier Awards

Tony Awards

Theatre awards

Critics' Circle Theatre Award 
 2004 Critics' Circle Theatre Award, Best New Play: The History Boys (won)
 2005 Critics' Circle Award for Distinguished Service to the Arts (won)

Drama Desk Award
 2003 Drama Desk Award, Outstanding Play: Talking Heads - nominated 
 2006 Drama Desk Award, Outstanding Play: The History Boys - won

Evening Standard Award 
 1968 Evening Standard Award, Special Award: Forty Years On - won 
 1985 Evening Standard British Film Award, Best Screenplay: A Private Function (shared with Malcolm Mowbray) - won
 1987 Evening Standard British Film Award, Best Screenplay: Prick Up Your Ears - won 
 1995 Evening Standard British Film Award, Best Screenplay: The Madness of King George - won
 2004 Evening Standard Award, Best Play: The History Boys - won

New York Drama Critics Circle 
 1963 New York Drama Critics' Circle Award, Special Award: Beyond the Fringe (shared with Peter Cook, Jonathan Miller and Dudley Moore) - won 
 2003 New York Drama Critics' Circle Award, Best Foreign Play: Talking Heads - won 
 2006 New York Drama Critics' Circle Award, Best Play: The History Boys - won

Outer Critics Circle Award 
 2003 Outer Critics Circle Award, Outstanding Off-Broadway Play: Talking Heads - nominated 
 2006 Outer Critics Circle Award, Outstanding Broadway Play: The History Boys - won

Miscellaneous awards

Bodley Medla 
 2008 Bodley Medal

Bollinger Prize 
 2008 Bollinger Everyman Wodehouse Prize: The Uncommon Reader - nominated

British Book Award 
 1995 British Book Award, Book of the Year: Writing Home - won 
 2002 British Book Award, Audiobook of the Year: The Laying on of Hands - won 
 2003 British Book Award, Lifetime Achievement Award
 2006 British Book Award, Author of the Year - won

British Comedy Award 
 2000 British Comedy Award, Lifetime Achievement Award

GLAAD Award 
 2007 GLAAD Media Award, Outstanding Film - Limited Release: The History Boys - nominated

Hawthornden Prize 
 1989 Hawthornden Prize: Talking Heads

JR Ackerley Prize 
 2006 J. R. Ackerley Prize for Autobiography: Untold Stories - won

London Film Critics Circle 
 1987 Critics' Circle Film Award, Screenwriter of the Year: Prick Up Your Ears - won
 1995 Critics' Circle Film Award, Screenwriter of the Year: The Madness of King George - won

Samuel Johnson Prize 
 2006 Samuel Johnson Prize: Untold Stories - nominated

References 

Bennett, Alan